John Wilde or Wylde may refer to:
John Wilde (jurist) (or Wylde; 1590–1669), English lawyer and politician
John Wylde (lawyer) (or Wild; –1840), Scottish lawyer and academic
Sir John Wylde (or Wilde; 1781–1859), Chief Justice of the Cape Colony
John Wilde (1919–2006), American painter

See also
John Wild (disambiguation)